The National Center for HIV/AIDS, Viral Hepatitis, STD, and TB Prevention (NCHHSTP), formerly the National Center for HIV, STD, and TB Prevention (NCHSTP) is a part of the Centers for Disease Control and Prevention and is responsible for public health surveillance, prevention research, and programs to prevent and control human immunodeficiency virus (HIV) infection and acquired immunodeficiency syndrome (AIDS), other sexually transmitted diseases (STDs), viral hepatitis, and tuberculosis (TB). Center staff work in collaboration with governmental and nongovernmental partners at community, State, national, and international levels, applying well-integrated multidisciplinary programs of research, surveillance, technical assistance, and evaluation.

In November 2005, Dr. Kevin Fenton, M.D., Ph.D., FFPH was named director of this center.

In March 2007, the center was renamed to the National Center for HIV/AIDS, Viral Hepatitis, STD, and TB Prevention (NCHHSTP) from the National Center for HIV, STD, and TB Prevention (NCHSTP) to reflect the addition of CDC's Viral Hepatitis program.

In December 2020, Dr. Demetre Daskalakis, M.D., M.P.H was named director of the Division of HIV/AIDS Prevention.

References

External links
 National Center for HIV/AIDS, Viral Hepatitis, STD, and TB Prevention - Official Site
 NCHHSTP account on USAspending.gov
 NCHHSTP Annual Report Fiscal Year 2010
 NCHHSTP Strategic Plan
 2010 White Paper on Social Determinants of Health

HIV/AIDS organizations in the United States
Centers for Disease Control and Prevention